Charles Whitaker House may refer to:

Charles Whitaker House (Davenport, Iowa), listed on the National Register of Historic Places in Scott County, Iowa
Charles Whitaker House (Georgetown, Kentucky), listed on the National Register of Historic Places in Scott County, Kentucky